Mausoleum of Kazi Nazrul Islam is a mausoleum in Dhaka, Bangladesh. It marks the grave of the 20th century writer, poet and musician Kazi Nazrul Islam, Bangladesh’s national poet. He died 29 August 1976.

Background

Bangladesh became independent on 16 December 1971. Then on 24 May 1972, after getting permission from the Indian government, then Prime Minister Sheikh Mujibur Rahman brought Kazi Nazrul Islam and his family from Kolkata to Dhaka. Then the poet started living in Bangladesh with his family. He wrote a song with the lyrics "Mosjideri Pashe Amay Kobor Diyo Bhai, Jeno Gore Thekeo Moazziner Azan Shunte Pai". He was admitted to PG Hospital of Dhaka (now Bangabandhu Sheikh Mujib Medical University) on 23 July 1975. After getting citizenship on 18 February 1976, his physical condition started to deteriorate. After his death on 29 August 1976, he was buried next to a mosque established in 1966, which was the central mosque of University of Dhaka, as per the wishes of the song he wrote.

The foundation stone of the project to convert Kazi Nazrul Islam's tomb area into a mausoleum was laid on 25 May 1999 and the mausoleum was inaugurated on 27 August 2009 by Prime Minister Sheikh Hasina ten years later. On 16 February 2011, two persons named Jaynath Nandi and Debashish Bhattacharya from West Bengal traveled to Bangladesh on a bicycle with soil from the grave of Kazi Nazrul Islam's wife Pramila Kazi located in Churulia. On 28 February, they placed that soil on the grave of Kazi Nazrul Islam. The mausoleum complex, designed by Muzharul Islam, covers the tombs of Kazi Nazrul Islam, Zainul Abedin, Quamrul Hassan, Muzaffar Ahmed Chowdhury and Abdul Matin Chowdhury.

References

 
Kazi Nazrul Islam
University of Dhaka
Kazi Nazrul Islam
Tourist attractions in Dhaka
Buildings and structures completed in 2009